Lee Jae-hwang (born December 26, 1976) is a South Korean actor and singer. He is best known for his role as Min Gun-woo in Temptation of Wife, a 2008 hit television series which garnered a high average viewership of 30% in South Korea.

Filmography

Television series

Television shows

Discography

Album

Awards and nominations

References

External links
 
 

1976 births
Living people
Male actors from Seoul
South Korean male television actors
20th-century South Korean male actors
21st-century South Korean male actors
South Korean male singers
Kyung Hee University